Chandler Winfield Sterling (January 28, 1911 – March 3, 1984) was a bishop of Montana in The Episcopal Church.

Biography
Sterling was born on January 28, 1911, in Dixon, Illinois, the Son of Robert Winfield Sterling and Mary Eleanor Chandler. He attended public schools in Dixon and Northwestern University in Evanston, Illinois. He graduated from Seabury-Western Theological Seminary in June 1938 and was ordained deacon that same month. He was ordained priest in December of the same year. On June 17, 1935, he married Catherine L. Ricker with whom he had 8 children.

Priesthood 
His first appointment was as curate at St Augustine's Church in Wilmette, Illinois, and Grace Church in Oak Park, Illinois. In 1941 he became rector of St Andrew's Church in Milwaukee and served as locum at Grace Church in Freeport, Illinois, from 1943 till 1944. In 1944 he became rector of Our Savior's Church in Elmhurst, Illinois, a post he held until 1950 when he became rector of Grace Church in Chadron, Nebraska, and was subsequently in charge of the mission in northwest Nebraska. He also served as chairman of the youth commission in the Diocese of Chicago and chairman of the Department for religious education in the Diocese of Nebraska.

Bishop
Stirling was elected Coadjutor Bishop of Montana in May 1956. He was consecrated on October 30, 1956, in St Peter's Pro-Cathedral by Henry Hean Daniels, Bishop of Montana. His co-consecrators were Howard R. Brinker of Nebraska and Joseph Minnis of Colorado.

References

1911 births
1984 deaths
People from Dixon, Illinois
Northwestern University alumni
Seabury-Western Theological Seminary alumni
20th-century American Episcopalians
Episcopal bishops of Montana
20th-century American clergy